Ukraine competed at the 2023 Winter World University Games in Lake Placid, United States, from 12 to 22 January 2023.

On 12 July 2022, it was announced that the Ukraine men's national ice hockey team was selected to compete at the Games. It will mark the return of the Ukraine team after the ten-year pause when the team last competed at the 2013 Winter Universiade. Ukraine will not compete in curling.

The national ice hockey team went on a tour in Canada before the Universiade. On December 30, the Ukrainian team lost 2–0 to the University of Saskatchewan Huskies.

On 28 December 2022, the Committee on the Physical Training and Sports of the Ministry of Youth and Sports of Ukraine announced that the Ukrainian team was expected to be represented by 61 athletes competing in 8 sports: biathlon, alpine skiing, Nordic combined, cross-country skiing, snowboarding, figure skating, ice hockey, and short track speed skating.

Medalists

Competitors

Alpine skiing

It was announced on 3 January 2022 that Ukraine would be represented by 1 male and 3 female alpine skiers.

Biathlon

It was announced on 2 January 2022 that Ukraine would be represented by 5 male and 3 female biathletes. But later Vitaliy Mandzyn was forced to withdraw from the competitions due to pneumonia. Ukraine was represented by four male and three female athletes who won two medals.

Men

Women

Mixed

Cross-country skiing

Ukraine was represented by 9 athletes.

Distance
Men

Women

Sprint

Relay

Figure skating

Ivan Shmuratko was scheduled to compete in the men's singles competition but he had to withdraw due to problems with his foot. Ukraine was thus represented in women's singles and ice dancing by one entry.

Ice hockey

Team roster
Head coach: Vadym Shakhraychuk

Summary

Nordic combined

Dmytro Mazurchuk and Vitalii Hrebeniuk won the first-ever medal for Ukraine in the sport at the Winter Universiades.

Men

Short track speed skating 

Ukraine was represented by 4 athletes.

Men

Women

Mixed

Snowboarding

Mykhailo Kharuk became the first Ukrainian Universiade champion in snowboarding. In total, Ukraine won three medals in snowboarding.

Snowboard cross

Parallel

References

External links
 Ukrainian medallists at the 2023 Winter World University Games

Nations at the 2023 Winter World University Games
Ukraine at the Winter Universiade
Winter World University Games